Landon Bow (born August 24, 1995) is a Canadian professional ice hockey goaltender currently playing for Rytíři Kladno of the Czech Extraliga (ELH). He has previously played for the Dallas Stars of the National Hockey League (NHL).

Playing career

Major junior
Bow was drafted 78th overall by the Swift Current Broncos in the 2010 WHL Draft. After playing nearly four seasons with the Broncos, Bow was traded to the Seattle Thunderbirds in exchange for Jamal Watson, Taz Burman, and a conditional 2nd round WHL Bantam Draft pick.

Professional
As an undrafted free agent, Bow was signed by the Texas Stars of the American Hockey League (AHL) to a one-year contract for the 2016–17 season. During his rookie season, Bow split his time between the Stars and their ECHL team, the Idaho Steelheads. For his efforts, Bow was named to the ECHL All-Rookie Team.

Following that season, Bow signed a two-year entry level NHL contract with the Dallas Stars on March 10, 2017. After attending the Stars training camp, he was assigned to the AHL to play out the 2017–18 season. Bow was called up once as a backup after starter Ben Bishop was injured in January but was sent down to the AHL without making his debut. He helped guide the Texas Stars to the 2018 Calder Cup playoffs only to lose to the Toronto Marlies in seven games.

Bow began the 2018–19 season in the AHL with the Texas Stars after being cut from the Dallas Stars training camp. After playing in 12 games, Bow was recalled to the NHL on November 21, 2018, where he made his NHL debut the following night by replacing starter Anton Khudobin in a 5–1 loss to the Pittsburgh Penguins. Bow saved all 14 shots he faced. Eight day later, after appearing in no more games, Bow was reassigned to the Texas Stars on November 29.

An impending restricted free agent following the 2019–20 season, Bow was not tendered a qualifying offer by the Stars on October 7, 2020, and was released to free agency. However, he later signed a one-year, two-way contract with the Stars on October 24.

As a free agent from the Dallas Stars, following his fifth season with the organization Bow left the club and signed his first contract abroad, agreeing to a one-year contract with Czech club Rytíři Kladno of the ELH on July 14, 2021.

Career statistics

Awards and honours

References

External links
 

1995 births
Living people
Canadian ice hockey goaltenders
Dallas Stars players
Idaho Steelheads (ECHL) players
Ice hockey people from Alberta
Sportspeople from St. Albert, Alberta
Seattle Thunderbirds players
Swift Current Broncos players
Texas Stars players
Undrafted National Hockey League players